ISO 31-13 gives name, symbol and definition for 62 quantities and units of solid state physics. Where appropriate, conversion factors are also given.

00031-13